Bohera A.T. Secondary School (EIIN - 118617) is one of the old schools of Debhata thana of Satkhira district. It was established in 1927. The school was named after two eminent persons named Azizul and Tosimuddin. The school is under Jessore Education Board.

See also
 Education in Bangladesh

References

Satkhira District
Educational institutions of Khulna Division
Schools in Bangladesh